Commune IV is a commune  of Bamako, Mali.

References 

 

Communities on the Niger River